2K22 may refer to:

 The year 2022
 2K22 Tunguska, Russian anti-aircraft weapon
 NBA 2K22, 2021 video game
 WWE 2K22, 2022 video game